Malinao may refer to one of several places in the Philippines:

 Malinao, Aklan, a municipality
 Malinao, Albay, a municipality
 Malinao, Tubajon, Dinagat Islands, a barangay
 Malinao Volcano, a potentially active volcano located in the Bicol Region of the Philippines